Christian Roman is an American animator, storyboard artist, producer and director. He is known for directing and executive producing the first season of the Disney Channel show American Dragon: Jake Long. He also designed the main characters and directed all 26 episodes of Disney's Fillmore!. Before Disney, he was a storyboard artist and storyboard supervisor on The Simpsons, during which time he wrote 'How to Storyboard The Simpsons Way'. He graduated from Boston University College of Fine Arts in 1991 with a degree in painting. He is currently a story artist at Pixar.

External links

Living people
American animators
Boston University College of Fine Arts alumni
American animated film directors
American animated film producers
American television directors
American television producers
American storyboard artists
Walt Disney Animation Studios people
Pixar people
Year of birth missing (living people)